Shirley O'Hara  (born Shirley Har, August 15, 1924 – December 13, 2002) was an American actress. She appeared in numerous films from the 1940s to the 1980s.

Biography
O'Hara was born in Rochester, Minnesota, in 1924 and graduated from Rochester High School in 1942. As a high-school senior, she worked at three film theaters in downtown Rochester.

After graduation, O'Hara moved to Hollywood. Her job as an elevator operator at Saks Fifth Avenue brought her in contact with people who worked with films, and she signed with RKO Studios when she was 18 years old. She began her acting career in 1943. Her film debut was in the Kay Kyser musical Around the World (1943). Other films in which she appeared included Tarzan and the Amazons, The Chase, Higher and Higher and Ghost Ship (1952).

O'Hara's figure led to her role in Ghost Ship, as the result of a process that was featured in the September 13, 1943, issue of Life. RKO held a competition to find the "shapeliest 'shadow girl'" for the role, because the leading lady in the film was seen only in silhouette.

During World War II, she received the Support for America award, acknowledging her wartime efforts with the Hollywood Canteen.

She also appeared in several TV series during the 1950s, including Fireside Theatre, Gunsmoke, The Millionaire, Racket Squad and Dragnet. In 1970, O'Hara appeared as Mrs. Drew on the TV western The Virginian in the episode "The Mysterious Mr. Tate."

During the early 1970s, she was appointed director of public relations for The Burbank Studios. In 1973, she played Mrs. Malone, a night school teacher, on the season four episode "Two Wrongs Don't Make a Writer" on The Mary Tyler Moore Show.  O’Hara appeared on three episodes of the Bob Newhart Show (Season 2 "T.S. Eliot", Season 3 “Dr. Ryan’s Express” and Season 5 “Et tu, Carol”) as the ditzy temporary secretary, Debbie Flett. Her character continually called Bob Dr. Ryan instead of Dr. Hartley. Also, during the 1970s, she appeared in the films Duel (1971) and Rocky (1976). She was a member of the Publicists Guild. She retired in 1995.

Personal life
O'Hara was married to Jimmy McHugh Jr., and they lived in England, where he headed the London branch of MCA Inc. They had one son, Jimmy McHugh III. Later she married Milton Krims.

Death
On December 13, 2002, O'Hara died at the Motion Picture Hospital in Calabasas, California, from complications of diabetes at the age of 78.

TV and filmography

 Gildersleeve on Broadway (1943) - Model (uncredited)
 Government Girl (1943) - Girl in Hotel Lobby (uncredited)
 Around the World (1943) - Shirley (uncredited)
 Higher and Higher (1943) - Bridesmaid (uncredited)
 The Ghost Ship (1943) - Ellen's Sister (uncredited)
 The Falcon Out West (1944) - Hat Check Girl (uncredited)
 Seven Days Ashore (1944) - Girl in Band (uncredited)
 Show Business (1944) - Chorine (uncredited)
 Step Lively (1944) - Louise, 'Daughter' in Rehearsal (uncredited)
 Three Is a Family (1944) - Janet (uncredited)
 Tarzan and the Amazons (1945) - Athena
 Cuban Pete (1946) - Girl (uncredited)
 The Runaround (1946) - Stewardess (uncredited)
 Lover Come Back (1946) - Show Girl (uncredited)
 The Chase (1946) - Manicurist
 Love Laughs at Andy Hardy (1946) - College Coed (uncredited)
 Bells of San Fernando (1947) - Nita
 Ghost Ship (1952)
 Mr. and Mrs. North (1953) - Phyllis Tucker
 Fireside Theatre (1953) - Mary Casey / Lucinda
 Crime Wave (1953) - Girl with Bandaged Man (uncredited)
 Schlitz Playhouse of Stars (1953) - Landlady
 December Bride (1954)
 The Star and the Story (1955) - Mrs. Canelli
 Highway Patrol (1956) - Payroll Clerk
 Sneak Preview (1956)
 The Detectives (1960) - Mrs. Stalker
 The 3rd Voice (1960) - Carreras' Secretary
 Sea Hunt (1960) - Fran Parmalee
 The High Powered Rifle (1960) - Jean Brewster
 Stagecoach West (1960) - Mrs. Jessup
 Rawhide (1960) - Mrs. Slocum
 Lock Up (1960) - Harriet Janis
 Schwarzer Kies (1961)
 The Little Shepherd of Kingdom Come (1961) - Mrs. Turner
 Love in a Goldfish Bowl (1961) - Clara Dumont
 Bus Stop (1961) - Mattie
 The Twilight Zone (1961-1963, TV Series) - Colonist / George's Wife
 The Untouchables (1962) - Mrs. Halvorsen
 Stoney Burke (1962) - Nurse
 The Eleventh Hour (1962-1963, TV Series) - Miss Pendleton / Nurse / Mrs. Stanger
 Sam Benedict (1963) - Helen Eddy
 The Outer Limits (1963)
 Gunsmoke (1960 - 1963) - Florie Neff / Mrs. Kurtch / Martha Guilbert
 Sylvia (1965) - Mrs. Karoki
 Perry Mason (1965) - Superintendent
 The Fugitive (1966) - Landlady
 The Hostage (1967) - Mrs. Primus
 Mannix, Season 2-Episode 23 "The Solid Gold Web" (1969)
 Mannix, Season 3-Episode 21 "Fly, Little One" (1970)
 Mannix, Season 4-Episode 22 "The Color Of Murder" (1971)
 Room 222 (1970) - Miss Foss / Teacher
 The Young Lawyers (1970) - Dr. Louise Cantrell
 Duel (1971) - Waitress
 Emergency! (1973) - Ellie
 The Streets of San Francisco (1976) - Mrs. Evans
 Rocky (1976) - Secretary
 Mary Tyler Moore (1975, TV Series) - night scoop teacher
 Rhoda (1977) - Marge
 Flight to Holocaust (1977) - Mrs. Bender
 Quincy (1978) - Mrs. Barnett
 The Incredible Hulk (1978) - Mrs. MacIntire
 CHiPs (1978) - Elderly Woman
 Crash (1978)
 Lucan (1978) - Sally
 Getting Wasted (1980) - Mrs. Kramer (final film role)

References

External links
 
 

1924 births
2002 deaths
American film actresses
American television actresses
People from Rochester, Minnesota
Deaths from diabetes
20th-century American actresses